The Langue de Barbarie (French for "Barbary spit of land", named after the Barbary Coast) is a thin, sandy peninsula, adjacent to the Atlantic Ocean, located in western Senegal, in the neighbourhood of the city of Saint-Louis. The peninsula separates the ocean from the final section of the Senegal River.

National park 

The Langue de Barbarie National Park is located at the southern edge of the peninsula. The park was named a Ramsar site in 2021.

2003 breach and environmental disaster 

A  breach was cut in the peninsula near the city of Saint-Louis on 3 October 2003 to help counter possible flooding. By January 2020, the breach had widened to 6 km.

References

External links 

 
 Opening hours and pricing

Peninsulas of Africa
Saint-Louis, Senegal
Senegal River
Environmental disasters in Africa
National parks of Senegal
Ramsar sites in Senegal